IMCA Sport Compact is IMCA's entry level class of racecars. They are found at IMCA tracks around the United States.

History
The series was formed in 2006, when six tracks ran the class. A seventh track was added in 2007.

Cars
IMCA Sport Compacts are three or four cylinder front-wheel drive compact cars. The car's interior is gutted for safety and weight reduction. Safety equipment such as a roll cage is installed. A $1500 claim rule is in effect.

Drivers
This division is designed for younger drivers, not those that want to get out of late models or modified racing. It's perfect for kids in high school, as there is a minimum age of 14. No one in this division can be licensed to compete in any other IMCA division.

Past Point Champions
2020 - Ramsey Meyer - Pierce, NE
2019 - Alex Dostal - Glencoe, MN
2018 - Ramsey Meyer - Pierce, NE
2017 - Dillon Richards - Beatrice, NE
2016 - Nate Coopman - Mankato, MN
2015 - Nate Coopman - Mankato, MN
2014 - Nate Coopman - Mankato, MN
2013 - Ramsey Meyer - Pierce, NE
2012 - Cameron Meyer - Pierce, NE
2011 - Nate Coopman - Mankato, MN
2010 - Darick Lamberson - Grand Island, NE
2009 - Garrett Rech - Davey, NE
2008 - Dan Rhiley - Bennington, NE
2007 - Jena Barthelmes - Marion, IA
Reference:

Past IMCA Super Nationals Champions
2020 - Rained Out
2019 - Nate Coopman - Mankato, MN
2018 Rained Out
2017 - Devin Jones - Mason City, IA
2016 - Josh Barnes - Keokuk, IA
2015 - Nate Coopman - Mankato, MN
2014 - Adam Gates - Marion, IA
2013 - Jacob Ellithorpe - Maquoketa, IA
2012 - Jacob Ellithorpe - Delmar, IA
2011 - Nathan Chandler - Norway, IA
Reference:

References

External links
Rules at official website

Stock car racing